Jonas Mikael Axeldahl (born 2 September 1970) is a Swedish former professional footballer. He played for U.S. Foggia, before moving to Ipswich Town, and then to Cambridge United where he retired. He represented Sweden at the 1992 Summer Olympics in Barcelona.

Honours
Ipswich Town
Football League First Division play-offs: 2000

References

External links
 
 
 
 
 

1970 births
Living people
Swedish footballers
Association football forwards
Olympic footballers of Sweden
Footballers at the 1992 Summer Olympics
Allsvenskan players
Serie B players
English Football League players
Calcio Foggia 1920 players
Ipswich Town F.C. players
Cambridge United F.C. players
Swedish expatriate footballers
Swedish expatriate sportspeople in Italy
Expatriate footballers in Italy
Swedish expatriate sportspeople in England
Expatriate footballers in England